Bhai Bhagwan Singh Gyanee was an Indian Nationalist and a leading luminary of the Ghadar Party. Elected the party president in 1914, he was extensively involved in the Ghadar Conspiracy of 1915 during World War I and in the aftermath of its failure fled to Japan. He is also known for his nationalist poems that were published in the Hindustan Ghadar and later in the compilation Ghadar di Gunj.

References
Bhai Bhagwan Singh Gyanee.
Across a chasm of seventy five years, the eyes of these dead men speak to today's Indian American, rediff.com.
Ghadar Revolution in America By Anil Baran Ganguly. 1980. Metropolitan
Indian Revolutionaries Abroad, 1905–1922. By Arun Bose . 1971. Bharati Bhawan
The Voyage of the Komagata Maru: The Sikh Challenge to Canada's Colour Bar. by Hugh J. M. Johnston.1989. University of British
Columbia Press.
History of the Freedom Movement in India By Ramesh Chandra Majumdar.1971. Firma K. L. Mukhopadhyay
KOMAGATA MARU - A Challenge to Colonialism: Key Documents by Prof. Malwinderjit Singh and Dr. Gurdev Singh Sidhu

External links
 Bhai Bhagwan Singh Gyanee materials in the South Asian American Digital Archive (SAADA)

Hindu–German Conspiracy
Ghadar Party
Indian revolutionaries
Indian independence movement